East Timor–Philippines relations refer to foreign relations between East Timor and the Philippines. The Philippines was actively involved in the United Nations peacekeeping forces in East Timor during its move towards independence. When several nations recognized East Timor's sovereignty, the Philippines began official diplomatic relations between the two governments with the establishment of an embassy in Dili and East Timor established its embassy in Pasig.

The pre-colonial kingdoms of the Philippines and East Timor had relations with each other even before the Iberian powers colonized these areas. During Magellan's Circumnavigation of the World, when his ships anchored at East Timor, they found the Lucoes (People of Luzon, Philippines) settling in East Timor and trading Philippine gold for East Timorese Sandalwood.

Since then, the Philippines has maintained strong ties with the newly born independent country sending peacekeepers to the country since 1999  amid its struggle for independence from Indonesia.  Both nations were conquered by the Iberian powers, mainly by Spain and Portugal, in the 16th century.

Relations

In 2008, East Timor and the Philippines signed three agreements to boost cooperation on marine and fisheries, education and foreign service training. Former Philippine President Gloria Macapagal Arroyo and Former East Timorese President José Ramos-Horta witnessed the signing of the pacts during their bilateral meeting. The Philippines has pledged increased commerce and trade with East Timor and has also sought to cultivate cultural and educational exchanges.
In 2010, when newly elected President Benigno Aquino III sworn in office, Timor-Leste President José Ramos-Horta expects stronger trade and diplomatic relations with the Philippines under his administration.
East Timor Foreign Minister Jose Luis Guterres held bilateral talks with his counterpart Albert del Rosario and met with President Benigno Aquino III during his stay in Manila.

The Philippines, one of two predominantly Catholic countries in Asia, is the strongest voice in ASEAN for Timor-Leste's ASEAN membership bid. The majority of Filipinos perceive a favorable response to East Timorese and are supportive of Timor-Leste's accession to ASEAN since its application.

Military aid

The Philippines offered to help East Timor military to improve its capability through education and training through the help of the Armed Forces of the Philippines. AFP Spokesperson  Col. Arnulfo Marcelo Burgos mentioned:

"Since East Timor is a very young nation with a newly-organized defense force, the Armed Forces of the Philippines offered its assistance in building their military capability".

References

External links
 
 

 
Philippines
Bilateral relations of the Philippines